Pulpatta  or  Pulpetta is a village in Eranad Taluk, Malappuram district in the state of Kerala, India. It is located 7 km away from Manjeri.

Location
Pulpatta is located on the northern side of Mongam, Valluvambram and Manjeri in Malappuram District, India. Actually pulpatta is located in manjeri - kizhissery road

Demographics
 India census, Pulpatta had a population of  42683 of which 21151 are males while 21532 are females.

Transportation
Pulpatta village connects to other parts of India through Manjeri town.  National highway No.66 passes through Parappanangadi and the northern stretch connects to Goa and Mumbai.  The southern stretch connects to Cochin and Trivandrum.   National Highway No.966 connects to Palakkad and Coimbatore.  The nearest airport is at Kozhikode.  The nearest major railway station is at Tirur.

References

   Villages in Malappuram district
Manjeri